Labid Khalifa (born 1955) is a Moroccan football defender who played for Morocco in the 1986 FIFA World Cup. He also played for KAC Kenitra.

References

External links
FIFA profile

1955 births
Moroccan footballers
Morocco international footballers
Association football defenders
KAC Kénitra players
Botola players
1986 African Cup of Nations players
1986 FIFA World Cup players
Living people
Mediterranean Games gold medalists for Morocco
Mediterranean Games medalists in football
Competitors at the 1983 Mediterranean Games